Ulrike Arnold (born 1950 in Düsseldorf) is a German artist.

Biography 
Ulrike Arnold studied music and art between 1968 and 1971, afterwards she worked as a teacher. From 1979 until 1986 she studied fine arts at the Düsseldorf academy in Professor Klaus Rinke's class. She was granted the Eduard von der Heydt apprenticeship of Wuppertal in 1988. Since 1980 the artist travels through all five continents to work although Ulrike Arnold mainly lives and works in Düsseldorf and in Flagstaff, Arizona.

Work as artist

Earth paintings
Earth paintings are typical of Arnold's art as she uses a unique material. She paints pictures with sorts of soil, minerals and stones on nettle fabric and on stone. She collects her colours in form of minerals which she then grinds to a paste for painting. The titles of her pictures correspond to the places across the world where she has found her ingredients, like Flagstaff, Arizona or Bryce Canyon in Utah. The structures, forms and colours of those paintings mirror the quality of the landscape where they are created on site. There they are exposed to the natural conditions of the place which even enhance their intensity.

Comet pictures
Since 2004 Ulrike Arnold is continuously expanding her repertoire of resources. She is the first artist worldwide to use particles of meteorites (nickel, iron and chondrules) which she purchases from research facilities. Those valuable substances originate from asteroids and comets. Their dark dust bears witness to the early universe. With it, Ulrike Arnold goes beyond the use of terrestric materials to create cosmological pictures.

Collections
Her art work can be found at many public museums and private collections, such as the North Rhine-Westphalian State Chancellery at Düsseldorf, the Düsseldorf museum of arts, the Ernst & Young collection, also Düsseldorf, at Deutsche Bank, Cologne, GLS bank, Bochum, Dennis Hopper's private collection at Venice, Los Angeles, California, Langen Foundation's collection at Neuss, Center for Art and Environment, Nevada Museum of Art Reno, Nevada or the Vollstedt private collection, the Museum of Northern Arizona, Flagstaff, and the Collection of Marvin and Kitty Killgore Southwest Meteorite Lab, Payson Arizona.

See also
 List of German painters

References

External links
 Ulrike Arnold's website
  film

1950 births
Living people
20th-century German painters
21st-century German painters
20th-century German women artists
21st-century German women artists
Artists from Düsseldorf
Kunstakademie Düsseldorf alumni